Eagle Point High School is a public high school in Eagle Point, Oregon, United States. The school has 1205 students. The school's nickname is the Eagles and its colors are royal blue and gold. The Eagle Point Eagles compete in the Southern Oregon Conference 5A-3 Midwestern League of the Oregon School Activities Association (OSAA). The current principal is Heather Marinucci .

History
In 1976, the school shut down due to a levy not passing.

Academics
In 2008, 83% of the school's seniors received a high school diploma. Of 294 students, 245 graduated, 29 dropped out, three received a modified diploma, and 17 were still in high school the following year.

In October 2009 the school was removed from the No Child Left Behind safety watch list, due to the following not occurring: "more than 1 percent of their students brought a weapon to school, were expelled for violence or committed a violent crime on campus."

In 2011, Eagle Point High School was awarded with an "outstanding" report card from the state of Oregon due to its increase in state test scores.

Labor relations
In May 2012, Eagle Point School District teachers and staff as well as bus drivers went on strike and left the school for three weeks. The strike lasted for two weeks and resulted in a tentative contract agreement.

In Fall of 2017, after one of the students killed themselves over repeated bullying caused by school inaction; the student body went on strike for 3 days. The school refused to allow those students standing together in remembrance of their classmate to complete their OAKS testing.

References

High schools in Jackson County, Oregon
Eagle Point, Oregon
Public high schools in Oregon